Kraja may refer to:

Skadarska Krajina an geographical region in southeastern Montenegro
Kraja, Germany, a municipality in Thuringia, Germany
Kraja, a folk music group from Umeå, Sweden.